Many regiments have over the years earned nicknames; some laudatory, some derogatory, but all colourful.  Sometimes, the nicknames themselves have overshadowed the actual regimental title, e.g. the "Van Doos" for the Royal 22e Régiment. In some cases the nickname actually replaced it: in 1881, the 42nd (Royal Highland) Regiment of Foot became officially known by its nickname, The Black Watch.

What follows is a list of nicknames of Canadian regiments, arranged alphabetically by regimental title. A brief explanation of the origin of the nickname, where known, is included.

Regimental nicknames

#

A-G

H-Q

R-Z

See also

 List of nicknames of British Army regiments
 List of warships by nickname
 Lists of nicknames – nickname list articles on Wikipedia
 Nicknames of U.S. Army divisions

Notes

References
Montague, Art (2011). Canadian Forces: An Historical Salute To Those On The Front Line. Lunenburg, Nova Scotia: MacIntyre Purcell Publishing Inc.
Mowat, Farley (1955). The Regiment. Toronto: McClelland and Stewart.

Regiments of Canada
Regimental Nicknames Of The Canadian Forces